Agelasta laosensis is a species of beetle in the family Cerambycidae. It was described by Pic in 1925. It is known from Laos.

References

laosensis
Beetles described in 1925